Joshua Freedman is a specialist on emotional intelligence, an author, and the Chief Executive Officer of Six Seconds, a non-profit dedicated to emotional intelligence (EQ). He has helped co-develop EQ assessments and published a number of books and articles on the topic, creating an international network of consultants and coaches.

Early life, education
Joshua Freedman was born in Berkeley, California in 1967, and attended the Head-Royce School in Oakland. After a stint at the University of Toronto he graduated from the World Arts and Culture program at UCLA, and went on to work at the Nueva Learning Center in California in the early 1990s. While there he worked with the emotional intelligence-focused "Self-Science" curriculum developed at the school. The curriculum was featured in Daniel Goleman's 1995 book Emotional Intelligence: Why It Can Matter More Than IQ, which helped bring EQ into the mainstream.

In 1997, Nueva School administrators and teachers Anabel Jensen, Karen McCown, Joshua Freedman and Marsha Rideout left the school to found the Six Seconds EQ Network, a non-profit focused on teaching people to practice emotional intelligence (EQ).

Career
In 2000, Freedman chaired the first international conference on the implementation of emotional intelligence in San Francisco, called NexusEQ. He has continued to chair the International NexusEQ Conferences, and the 7th conference is at Harvard University in June 2013.

In 2004, Freedman was appointed Chief Operating Officer (COO), and Chief Executive Officer (CEO) in 2013. He's since managed the development of an international network with offices and representative in 25 countries and certified practitioners in over 75. He has trained individuals or teams on EQ and business organization from FedEx, Lockheed Martin, Etihad Airways, the World Bank Group, American Express, Morgan Stanley, Make-A-Wish Foundation, Microsoft, all branches of the US armed services, the UN, and others.

Publications, research
Freedman's applied research focuses on "organizational climate and the factors that enhance individual and team performance." He has completed several studies on how emotional intelligence effects the performance and well-being of social groups, and has focused on retired players from the US National Football League, business leaders in the Middle East, and businesses at all steps of the ladder. Much of his work focuses on the obstacles and drivers of organizational change, and he and Todd Everett are authors of the whitepaper “The Business Case for Emotional Intelligence,” which reports on findings from their EQ research.

Freedman is the author of several psychometric assessments.  He co-authored the Organizational Vital Signs (OVS) assessment for measuring "organizational climate," or workplace environment.  The Six Seconds Emotional Intelligence Assessment, or SEI™, is a validated assessment used in business and education in ten languages.

He has published six books, starting with his co-authoring of Self-Science in 1998 and The Handle With Care EQ Activity Book in 1999. In 2007 his book At the Heart of Leadership: How to Get Results with Emotional Intelligence was first published, with a third edition published in 2012, the book has over 50,000 copies sold. In 2010 Inside Change: Transforming Your Organization with Emotional Intelligence (co-authored with Massimiliano Ghini) was released. The Vital Organization: How to create a high-performing workplace (2014) was also co-authored with Massimiliano Ghini and in 2015, Freedman published Whole-Hearted Parenting: How to use emotional intelligence to create more peace, connection, and joy. He is also the lead editor of the management curriculum, Developing Human Performance.

Freedman's work has been featured in both scholarly press, including a piece of the development of emotional intelligence for executive performance in the Journal of Leadership Studies in 2007. He is mentioned in the books EQ from the Inside Out and Educating People to Be Emotionally Intelligent, as well was criticisms of his work in books such as Bright-sided: How the Relentless Promotion of Positive Thinking Has Undermined America.

In popular media, Freedman has been quoted extensively in publications such as  Redbook, O Magazine, and the Today Show. In 2014 he was quoted in Climate One's article 'Ecological Intelligence''' and Medical Daily. He has contributed to articles for Christian Science Monitor (2015), Forbes (2013) and In June 2013, Brazil’s top business paper Época Negócios published an in-depth interview with Freedman titled How is your emotional intelligence doing? He has been a guest on several radio shows, including a segment on Charles Wolfe's show The Emotion Roadmap: Take the Wheel and Control How You Feel (2013), Bob Gourley's Issues Today (2015) and The Jordan Rich Show (2015).

Personal life
Freedman lives on the Central Coast in California with his wife and two children. He has served on the Board of Directors of several schools and organizations, including Synapse School.  He is an environmentalist.

Publishing History

Books
1998: Self-Science: The Emotional Intelligence Curriculum (Six Seconds, English and Italian) - co-author
2007: At the Heart of Leadership (Six Seconds, English, Chinese, and Italian)
2010: Inside Change: Transforming Your Organization with Emotional Intelligence2012: At the Heart of Leadership (3rd Edition, Six Seconds)
2014: The Vital Organization: How to create a high-performing workplace (Field Guide) - co-author
2015: Whole-Hearted Parenting: How to use emotional intelligence to create more peace, connection, and joy''

References

External links
Freedman Educational Videos
Profile at Six Seconds
"Emotional Intelligence: why you should care, what it is, and how you can build more!" by Joshua Freedman (Kidsource, January 1999)
"Joshua Freedman Interview: Emotional Intelligence for an Empathetic Society"  (Eco Walk the Talk, March 2, 2012)
"E-Learning Production Secret Revealed: Emotional Intelligence" by Joshua Freedman (Learning Solution Magazine, June 5, 2006)
"Joy and Loss: The Emotional Lives of Gifted Children" by Joshua Freedman and Anabel Jensen (Kidsource, 1999)

Living people
American educators
UCLA School of the Arts and Architecture alumni
American chief operating officers
Emotional intelligence academics
American nonprofit chief executives
Chief operating officers
Year of birth missing (living people)